Teura Iriti (born 7 January 1965) is a Tahitian politician, member of Tahoera'a Huiraatira party.

She has been President of the Arue, French Polynesia since 2003. She was the head candidate of her party's senatorial party in September 2014, having chaired Tahoeraa Huiraatira's group at the Assembly of French Polynesia: she is elected Senator in the first round with 411 votes. Her election was invalidated on 6 February 2015 by the Constitutional Council of France.

Candidate in the 2017 legislative elections in the second constituency, Iriti came second in the first round on 3 June, thirteen points behind Nicole Sanquer, Tapura Huiraatira candidate.

She was elected president delegate of Tahoeraa Huiraatira party on 6 June 2017.

References

1965 births
Living people
French Polynesian women in politics
Members of the Assembly of French Polynesia
Senators of French Polynesia
Tahitian women
21st-century French women politicians
Tahoera'a Huiraatira politicians
People from Papeete
Women members of the Senate (France)